Missouri elected its member October 7, 1822.

See also 
 1822 and 1823 United States House of Representatives elections
 List of United States representatives from Missouri

1822
Missouri
United States House of Representatives